Costhorpe is a hamlet in the civil parish of Carlton in Lindrick, in the Bassetlaw district in Nottinghamshire, England. It is to the north of Worksop.

References 

Hamlets in Nottinghamshire
Carlton in Lindrick